Camp Highlands for Boys is a private summer camp for boys ages 8–16 in Sayner, Wisconsin.

History
The camp was founded in 1904 by Harry O. Gillet, Elementary School Principal at the University of Chicago Laboratory School. At the urging of Lab School parents, property on Plum Lake was purchased, removing the boys from Chicago and immersing them in the north woods, where they could experience a summer of physical activity, wilderness and fellowship. Star Lake, adjacent to Plum, was the end of the line for a northern Wisconsin branch of the Chicago, Milwaukee, St. Paul railroad. Until 1922, the only transportation into the area was by rail and water. Boys were dropped at Plum Lake Station by the "Camp Special" (originating at Union Station in Chicago) and ferried to the opposite shore.

William J. Monilaw, Lab School instructor, bought the camp from Gillet in 1914. The former Drake University and University of Missouri athletic coach (football, track & field), oversaw the camp until 1959, creating the physical and philosophical structures still in place today. Under his leadership, the camp experience grew to include athletic training, character building, and wilderness trips. Today's trip program includes sailing and sea kayaking excursions through the Apostle Islands National Lakeshore, canoeing in the Minnesota Boundary Waters, and hiking in the Porcupine Mountains, Isle Royale National Park, and Pictured Rocks National Lakeshore.

Alumni of Camp Highlands include Senator William Proxmire, Cold War strategist and Ambassador to Russia George F. Kennan, Secretary of the Navy and Cold War Presidential Advisor Paul Nitze, and Heisman Trophy winners Jay Berwanger and Nile Kinnick. Berwanger spent the summer prior to winning the first trophy at Camp Highlands in 1935. Kinnick spent the summer of 1938 at the camp and won the trophy in 1939.  Actor Bruce Dern was a camper. Photographer Ray Metzker was on the staff in the early 1950s; he taught photography.

More recent alumni include comedian John Roy, philosopher A.J. Julius, photographer Mario Sorrenti, professional basketball player Steve Goodrich, and comedian and television star Dave Coulier (Full House).

Mike and Sharon Bachmann owned and operated the camp from 1969 to Sharon's passing on May 30th, 2019, at which time it was inherited by son's Tim and Andy Bachmann, and daughter Laura Cubillos. (Mike Bachmann passed away September 7, 2014.) The three children gifted their ownership of the camp's corporation to a newly established not-for-profit organization, the Camp Highlands for Boys Foundation, in December of 2021. Andy and his wife Tracy have directed the camp since 2014.

Gallery

References

External links 
 Camp Highlands website
 Highlands Archives website

Highlands
Buildings and structures in Vilas County, Wisconsin